Alyssa Parker (born August 4, 1994) is an American field hockey player who plays for the US national team.

Early life 
Parker's mom was a field hockey player. When her sister took up field hockey, she decided to start playing as well.

Career 
Parker played field hockey for Glenelg High School. She was the first player in the Washington area to score 100 goals during her high school career. She also recorded 100 assists, and is only the second player in the country to have at least 100 goals and assists. She was named the Baltimore Sun's Player of the Year in 2011.

Parker played for the University of Maryland in college.

Parker was part of the US National Team that played in the 2019 FIH Pro League, as well as the 2020 FIH Pro League.

References

American female field hockey players
Female field hockey goalkeepers
1994 births
Living people
21st-century American women